Cecil "Ces" Burke (27 March 1914 – 4 August 1997) was a New Zealand cricketer who played for Auckland and, once, for New Zealand. He was born in Ellerslie, New Zealand and died in Auckland, New Zealand.

Cricket career

A lower-order right-handed batsman and a leg-break and googly bowler, Burke, variously known as "Cec" or "Ces", made his first-class debut for Auckland in 1937-38 and then played regularly for the team up to the 1953–54 season. He was picked as a specialist bowler for the single Test match played in 1945-46 between New Zealand and Australia, which was won comprehensively by the Australians, New Zealand failing to total 100 runs in their two innings combined. Burke took two Australian wickets – Bill Brown and Keith Miller.

He was 12th man for the single Test match of the following season, 1946–47, when MCC toured Australia and New Zealand, and was selected for the tour to England in 1949. He had a mixed tour, taking 54 wickets in 18 games at an average of 29.83, including 6–23 against Derbyshire, but scoring just 171 runs. During the course of the tour he injured his hand and as a consequence did not play in any of the Tests.

See also
 List of Auckland representative cricketers
 One-Test wonder

References

External links
 Profile at CricketArchive

1914 births
1997 deaths
New Zealand cricketers
New Zealand Test cricketers
Auckland cricketers
Cricketers from Auckland
North Island cricketers